Cornelius Leahy is the name of:

 Con Leahy (1876–1921), Irish athlete
 Cornelius J. Leahy (1872–1900), Private in the United States Army, Medal of Honor recipient